Symphyotrichum hendersonii (formerly Aster hendersonii) is a species of flowering plant in the family Asteraceae native to the northwestern United States. Its flowers have purple ray florets and yellow disk florets.

Citations

References

hendersonii
Flora of the Northwestern United States
Plants described in 1895
Taxa named by Merritt Lyndon Fernald